Miami Vice is a 1980s American television series.

Miami Vice may also refer to:

Miami Vice franchise
 Miami Vice (film), a 2006 film adaptation of the TV series
 Miami Vice (video game), a 1986 video game based on the TV series
 Miami Vice: The Game, a 2006 tie-in video game based on the film
 Miami Vice Theme, theme song for Miami Vice

Other uses
 "Miami Vice" (song), 2019 song by Gims
 Miami Vice Squad, an indoor football team in Coral Gables, FLA, USA
 Miami Vice FC, a soccer team in Fort Lauderdale, FLA, USA
 Miami-Dade Police Department vice squads

See also

 
 Miami (disambiguation)
 Vice (disambiguation)